The William J. and Lizzie Cullimore House at 396 W. 1600 N. in Orem, Utah, United States, was built in approximately 1907.  It was listed on the National Register of Historic Places (NRHP) in 1998.  The listing included two contributing buildings.

At the time of its NRHP listing, it was one of only six similar houses remaining in Orem.

References

Houses completed in 1907
Houses in Orem, Utah
Houses on the National Register of Historic Places in Utah
National Register of Historic Places in Orem, Utah